Below is a list of heads of mission from the United Kingdom to the Republic of Peru since 1874:

Heads of Mission

Minister Resident and Consul-General
1873–1874: Hon. William Stafford-Jerningham (previously Chargé d'Affaires and Consul-General to the Republic of Peru)
1874–1884: Spenser St. John
1885–1894: Charles Mansfield
1894–1898: Henry Mitchell Jones, also to Ecuador 1895

Envoy Extraordinary and Minister Plenipotentiary
1898–1908: William Beauclerk (also to Bolivia and Ecuador; died in 1908 in Lima)
1908–1913: Charles des Graz (also to Bolivia and Ecuador)
1914–1919: Ernest Rennie (also to Ecuador)
1920–1923: Arthur Grant Duff (also to Ecuador)
1923–1928: Lord Herbert Hervey (also to Ecuador)
1929–1933: Charles Bentinck (also to Ecuador)
1934–1944: Courtenay Forbes (also to Ecuador until 1935)

Ambassador Extraordinary and Plenipotentiary
1944–1945: Sir Courtenay Forbes
1945–1948: Walter Roberts
1949–1951: Sir James Dodds
1951–1953: Sir Oswald Scott
1953–1958: Sir William Montagu-Pollock
1958–1963: Sir Berkeley Gage
1963–1967: Robert Marett
1967–1970: David Muirhead
1970–1974: Hugh Travers Morgan
1974–1977: Kenneth Jamieson
1977–1979: William Harding
1979–1983: Charles Wallace
1983–1987: John Shakespeare
1987–1989: Adrian Beamish
1990–1995: Keith Haskell
1995–1999: John Illman
1999–2003: Roger Hart
2003–2006: Richard Ralph
2006–2010: Catherine Nettleton
2010–2014: James Dauris
2014–2018: Anwar Choudhury

From 2018: Kate Harrisson

References

External links
UK and Peru, gov.uk

 
Peru
United Kingdom